"Born to Run" is a song written by Paul Kennerley, and recorded by American country music artist Emmylou Harris.  It was released in May 1982 as the third single from the album Cimarron.

The song takes its melody from "The Death of Me," a song from The Legend of Jesse James, a concept album written by Kennerley. This version was performed by Johnny Cash and Levon Helm.

The song reached number 3 on the Billboard Hot Country Singles & Tracks chart. The song was covered by country Music Artist Lee Ann Womack in 2016 on The Life & Songs Of Emmylou Harris: An All-Star Concert Celebration (Live). It was later covered by Irish actress Jessie Buckley for the 2019 country music drama film Wild Rose.

Charts

Weekly charts

Year-end charts

References

1982 singles
1982 songs
Emmylou Harris songs
Lee Ann Womack songs
Songs written by Paul Kennerley
Song recordings produced by Brian Ahern (producer)
Warner Records singles